Greatest Hits is the second greatest hits compilation released by American country music artist Tracy Byrd. It was released in 2005 as his only album for BNA Records. The tracks "Revenge of a Middle-Aged Woman" and "Johnny Cash" were previously unreleased; only the former was released as a single. "Johnny Cash", however, was later recorded by Jason Aldean for his 2007 album Relentless, and his version was a Top Ten hit on the country music charts. The songs "Watermelon Crawl" and "I'm from the Country" were newly recorded for this compilation.

Track listing

Personnel

Tracks 4, 5, 9
Mike Brignardello - bass guitar
Tracy Byrd - lead vocals
Joe Carter - harmonica, background vocals
Dan Dugmore - steel guitar
Steve Gibson - electric guitar
Aubrey Haynie - fiddle
John Barlow Jarvis - B-3 organ, piano
Paul Leim - drums
John Wesley Ryles - background vocals
Kenny Sears - fiddle
Mike Taliaferro - background vocals
Biff Watson - acoustic guitar
Curtis "Mr. Harmony" Young - background vocals
Reggie Young - electric guitar

Tracks 11, 12
Pat Buchanan - electric guitar
Tracy Byrd - lead vocals
Paul Franklin - steel guitar
Aubrey Haynie - fiddle
Wes Hightower - background vocals
John Barlow Jarvis - B-3 organ, piano
B. James Lowry - acoustic guitar
Brent Mason - electric guitar
Greg Morrow - drums
Adam Shoenfeld - electric guitar
Neil Thrasher - background vocals
Billy Joe Walker Jr. - acoustic guitar, electric guitar
Glenn Worf - bass guitar

Chart performance

References
[ Allmusic]

2005 greatest hits albums
Tracy Byrd albums
BNA Records compilation albums